An open economy is a type of economy where not only domestic factors but also entities in other countries engage in trade of products (goods and services). Trade can take the form of managerial exchange, technology transfers, and all kinds of goods and services. Certain exceptions exist that cannot be exchanged; the railway services of a country, for example, cannot be traded with another country to avail the service.

It contrasts with a closed economy in which international trade and finance cannot take place. The act of selling goods or services to a foreign country is called exporting.  The act of buying goods or services from a foreign country is called importing. Exporting and importing are collectively called international trade.

Advantages and Disadvantages 
There are a number of economic advantages for citizens of a country with an open economy. A primary advantage is that the citizen consumers have a much larger variety of goods and services from which to choose. Additionally, consumers have an opportunity to invest their savings outside the country. There are also economic disadvantages of an open economy. Open economies are interdependent on others and this exposes them to certain unavoidable risks.

History 
The idea of the open economy shares a relationship with the idea of globalization. This process of people, businesses, and governments connecting and interacting with one another across all countries and continents is a direct correlation to the idea of open economies. There are several historical events that have affected these ideologies simultaneously. For example, the Silk Road, which connected Eastern Asia with the Middle East and Europe. Another example would be global wars such as World War I and World War II, which had the effect of creating alliances and partnerships between countries, tying them economically to one another. 

Open economies are influenced by political views as well. Economic openness as a political economic concept began in the 19th century and was characterized two schools of thought. Opponents of open economies believe that it could weaken national economies due to its competitive nature, while proponents of open economies believe that economic openness would positively impact trade and stimulate job growth and economic opportunities.

Conclusion 
If a country has an open economy, that country is spending in any given year need not equal its output of goods and services. A country can spend more money than it produces by borrowing from abroad, or it can spend less than it produces and lend the difference to foreigners.
 there is no totally-closed economy.

See also 
 Exchange rate
 Gains from trade
 Terms of trade
International trade theory

References

Economics catchphrases
International trade
International macroeconomics